"Around The World / Kandata" is Flow's tenth single. "Around The World" was used as the advertising theme song for the Suzuki Swift. It reached #23 on the Oricon charts in its first week and charted for five weeks.

Track listing

References

Flow (band) songs
2006 singles
2006 songs
Ki/oon Music singles